Tikti Punta (Quechua tikti wart, punta peak; ridge; first, before, in front of, "wart peak", also spelled Ticte Punta) is a  mountain in the Andes of Peru. It is located in the Huánuco Region, Dos de Mayo Province, Marías District. Tikti Punta lies southeast of Wank'a Ukru Punta and northeast of a lake named Saqsaqucha ("multi-colored lake").

References

Mountains of Peru
Mountains of Huánuco Region